Blissfield can refer to:

Canada
Blissfield Parish, New Brunswick

United States
Blissfield, Michigan
Blissfield Township, Michigan
Blissfield, Ohio